Martina Navratilova defeated Zina Garrison in the final, 6–4, 6–1 to win the ladies' singles tennis title at the 1990 Wimbledon Championships. It was her ninth Wimbledon singles title and 18th and final major singles title overall, tying Chris Evert's Open Era record.

Steffi Graf was the two-time defending champion, but lost in the semifinals to Garrison. This marked the first time since the 1987 Australian Open that Graf did not reach a major final, ending a record of 13 consecutive appearances.

By defeating Monica Seles in the quarterfinals, Garrison ended the former's 36-match winning streak, extending back to Miami earlier that year.

Seeds

  Steffi Graf (semifinals)
  Martina Navratilova (champion)
  Monica Seles (quarterfinals)
  Gabriela Sabatini (semifinals)
  Zina Garrison (final)
  Arantxa Sánchez Vicario (first round)
  Katerina Maleeva (quarterfinals)
  Manuela Maleeva-Fragnière (first round)
  Mary Joe Fernández (withdrew)
  Helena Suková (fourth round)
  Natasha Zvereva (quarterfinals)
  Jennifer Capriati (fourth round)
  Jana Novotná (quarterfinals)
  Judith Wiesner (fourth round)
  Rosalyn Fairbank (second round)
  Barbara Paulus (first round)

Mary Joe Fernández withdrew due to a knee injury. She was replaced in the draw by lucky loser Anna Ivan.

Qualifying

Draw

Finals

Top half

Section 1

Section 2

Section 3

Section 4

Bottom half

Section 5

Section 6

Section 7

Section 8

References

External links

1990 Wimbledon Championships – Women's draws and results at the International Tennis Federation

Women's Singles
Wimbledon Championship by year – Women's singles
Wimbledon Championships